Selfish Love may refer to:

 Selfish Love (manga), 2004
 "Selfish Love" (Jessie Ware song), 2017
 "Selfish Love" (DJ Snake and Selena Gomez song), 2021
 "Selfish Love", a song by Mabel from the album High Expectations, 2019